Jessica Lucas (born September 24, 1985) is a Canadian actress. She is known for her roles in television, such as Edgemont, Melrose Place, Cult, and Gotham, and in the films The Covenant, Cloverfield and the 2013 Evil Dead. She also starred in the music video for Coldplay's 2014 single "True Love".

Life
Lucas was born and raised in Vancouver, British Columbia. Her father is Black Canadian, and her mother is European Canadian. She began acting at seven years old, and trained with the Children's Arts Theatre School in Toronto. She started her career appearing in stage productions, including local productions of Snow White & The Seven Dwarfs, Grease, Cinderella, Mousetrap and Music Medley.

In April 2017, Lucas announced her engagement to chef Alex Jermasek.

Career
In 2001, she joined the Canadian teen drama television series Edgemont as recurring character Bekka Lawrence, later becoming a series regular on the show, which she remained through the end of the show's run in 2005. She was also a series regular on another Canadian television series, YTV's short-lived 2030 CE in 2002.

She guest starred in an episode of The L Word as Roxanne in 2004. She went on to appear as a series regular in the short-lived ABC teen drama series Life as We Know It as Sue; the series which ran for just one season. In 2006, she appeared in the film She's the Man and co-starred in The Covenant. She was cast in another ABC television pilot, Secrets of a Small Town, though it was not picked up to series.

In 2007, she joined the cast of CSI: Crime Scene Investigation playing the recurring character of Ronnie Lake. Despite appearing in four episodes, rumours were denied that she would be a permanent replacement for Sara Sidle. The character was written out of the series with no explanation. She also appeared in a made-for-television film Split Decision.

In 2008, she guest starred as Kimberly MacIntyre in four episodes of The CW's 90210. She also starred in a leading role as Lily in J. J. Abrams Cloverfield, which was a box office success and was well received by critics. She was cast as Lisa in the film Amusement in 2006; the film was set to be released theatrically by New Line Cinema, but after a negative reaction it was released instead straight-to-DVD in 2009. The same year, Lucas was announced to have signed on as Riley Richmond, one of the lead roles in another CW television series Melrose Place, a followup to the popular 1990s series of the same name.

Lucas was part of the main cast of the NBC sitcom Friends with Benefits, which aired during the summer of 2011 before being cancelled.  In 2011, she played Haley in Big Mommas: Like Father, Like Son, where she showcased her singing talents as well as her acting skills.

In 2012, Lucas was cast as the lead character, Skye Yarrow, in the CW series Cult, which was filmed in the spring of 2012. In 2012, she was cast in a main role in the 2013 remake of the classic horror film The Evil Dead. In 2014, Lucas appeared in Pompeii directed by Paul W. S. Anderson.

From 2015 to 2019, she has had a regular role in Fox's Gotham as Tabitha Galavan. In 2019, Lucas played the starring role of Kate Jameson in the Canadian crime drama television series The Murders which aired on Citytv. In late 2020, she was cast in the regular role of Billie in the fourth season of the Fox medical drama television series The Resident.

Filmography

Film

Television

References

External links

 
 

1985 births
Living people
Actresses from Vancouver
Black Canadian actresses
Canadian child actresses
Canadian expatriate actresses in the United States
Canadian film actresses
Canadian television actresses
21st-century Canadian actresses